Dirty Harry is a canceled video game that was in development by The Collective intended to be published by Warner Bros. Interactive. The game was to continue the story of the 1971 film of the same name starring Clint Eastwood as Harry Callahan, the protagonist. Eastwood was intended to reprise his role, lending his voice and likeness as well as consulting and creative input. The game was to follow the same storyline of the film, with the San Francisco detective tracking down a serial killer named Scorpio. Versions were planned for both the PlayStation 3 and Xbox 360 consoles, with a release in 2007.

Story 
The game was to take place between Dirty Harry and Magnum Force, with the aim being to give more depth to the character.

Development 
A trailer for the game has been the only example given of the game's gameplay or engine capabilities. It is neither a computer generated cutscene nor actual gameplay. Instead, Warner Bros. gave its models and engine schematics to an animation house to produce a simulation of the gameplay.

The trailer ends with the classic scene from Dirty Harry. The "Do I feel lucky?" line was pulled straight from the film as Clint Eastwood never recorded a voice over for the video game.

Warner Bros. was reluctant to release details on the gameplay, but offered a few hints. While it was never confirmed, it appears that Dirty Harry was to offer a free-roaming San Francisco. "The city of San Francisco can be a character", Warner Bros. Jason Hall said, "It can live".

One key aspect of gameplay was discussed in slight detail. As in the films, Harry Callahan walks the line between bad cop and psychopath. Players were also to walk that line. The game was to feature reactive AI, both for crooks and cops. While there was no further explanation, it appeared that if the player was soft on crooks, they may not take Harry Callahan seriously. On the other end, excessive force will put you in trouble with the police chief.

Promotion 
According to official press releases by Warner Bros., "Dirty Harry helped define a genre and introduced the world to a character who has since become a cultural icon, so bringing Clint Eastwood's authentic Dirty Harry character to this next generation of consoles provides exciting promise for game playing audiences everywhere", said Jason Hall, senior vice president of Warner Bros. Interactive Entertainment. "Our work with The Collective is aimed at culminating in a game with an all-new story that allows players to experience the action and suspense of the legendary franchise firsthand."

"Working with Warner Bros. Interactive Entertainment and Clint Eastwood to create a compelling, state-of-the-art game that brings Dirty Harry Callahan to life on next generation consoles is very exciting", said Doug Hare, co-founder and Vice President of Production for The Collective. "We are focused on creating genre defining story-telling gameplay, along with next generation graphics depicting action-packed sequences that are consistent with the renowned films."

Cancelation 
The game was canceled in 2007 due to reported "trouble" at The Collective, which was later revealed to be budgetary issues and a rushed schedule—along with their then-recent merger with Shiny Entertainment to form Double Helix Games.

Further reading 
 http://www.ign.com/articles/2007/03/02/dirty-harry-feeling-not-so-lucky
 http://www.gameinformer.com/b/features/archive/2012/04/24/the-cancelled-game-database-of-this-generation-39-s-games.aspx?PostPageIndex=3
 http://www.ugo.com/games/dirty-harry.html
 http://www.gamesradar.com/dirty-harry-lays-down-the-law/
 https://www.destructoid.com/screens-from-canned-dirty-harry-game-show-off-wrinkly-old-clint-eastwood-face-122943.phtml
 http://www.nintendolife.com/news/2016/04/video_see_if_this_tale_of_the_cancelled_dirty_harry_game_makes_your_day

External links 
GameSpot article on Dirty Harry (working title)
IGN article on Dirty Harry (working title)

Cancelled PlayStation 3 games
Cancelled Xbox 360 games
Dirty Harry video games
Organized crime video games
Video games about police officers
Video games set in San Francisco
Video games set in the 1970s
The Collective (company) games